Albert Coleman was an English footballer who played as a half back for South Kirkby and Rotherham United.

Playing career
Coleman began his football career with South Kirkby before moving to Frickley then Scarborough before joining Rotherham United, where he spent three seasons. In November 1931 he returned to Frickley from Rotherham.

References

Date of death missing
English footballers
Association football defenders
South Kirkby Colliery F.C. players
Scarborough F.C. players
Rotherham United F.C. players
Year of birth missing